Marnie McPhail Diamond is an American actress and musician who is well known for playing Maria Wong in Braceface, Annie Edison in The Edison Twins, and Peaches in JoJo's Circus.

Personal life
McPhail was born and raised in Columbus, Ohio, United States. Later, she moved to Toronto, Ontario, where she attended the Etobicoke School of the Arts. At age 14, she was cast in her first major role as Annie Edison in the children's television series The Edison Twins (1982). She first met her husband, Reed Diamond, on the set of Scared Silent (2002) and they have been married since 2004. McPhail and her husband are both members of the rock band "Chuck Valiant;" McPhail is the lead singer and Diamond plays guitar. She appeared in Sliders series 3/22 episode, Revelations.

Filmography
This list of movies, shows, and games is incomplete. You can help by adding to the list.

Awards and nominations

References

External links

Living people
Actresses from Columbus, Ohio
Actresses from Toronto
American emigrants to Canada
American film actresses
American television actresses
American voice actresses
Best Actress in a Drama Series Canadian Screen Award winners
Musicians from Columbus, Ohio
Year of birth missing (living people)